Mohammad Saleh Zari was Governor of Faryab Province in Afghanistan from the fall of the Taliban in 2001 until 2003.  He was reportedly associated with warlord Abdul Rashid Dostum.

References

Governors of Faryab Province
Living people
Year of birth missing (living people)
Place of birth missing (living people)
21st-century Afghan people